Thattathumala is a town in Trivandrum district of, Kerala, India. It is situated 3 km from Kilimanoor city center on the MC/SH 1 Road.
Nearest Railway Station — Chirayankizh
Nearest Airport - Trivandrum International Airport

References

External links
 Kerala Govt
Thiruvananthapuram district Website
NILAMEL official website

Villages in Thiruvananthapuram district